In mathematics, an ultrapolynomial is a power series in several variables whose coefficients are bounded in some specific sense.

Definition
Let  and  a field (typically  or ) equipped with a norm (typically the absolute value).

References

Mathematical analysis